Brackett  may refer to:

 Brackett (surname)
 Brackett (crater), a lunar crater named after Frederick Sumner Brackett
 Brackett Field, public airport in La Verne, California
 Brackett, Wisconsin, an unincorporated community in Eau Claire County, Wisconsin

See also
 Brackett series, a series of absorption or emission lines of hydrogen, discovered by Frederick Sumner Brackett
 Brackett House (disambiguation)
 Bracket
 Brockett